Wentworth Airport  is located at Wentworth, New South Wales, Australia.

Sunraysia Sport Aircraft Club hosts a fly-in each year on Queens Birthday weekend.

Wentworth Airport is adjacent to the Perry Sandhills.

See also
List of airports in New South Wales
Mildura Airport in Victoria, a nearby airport with scheduled services

References

Airports in New South Wales